Silver Creek Township is a civil township of Cass County in the U.S. state of Michigan. The population was 3,218 at the 2010 census.

Geography
Silver Creek Township is located in the northwest corner of Cass County, bordered to the west by Berrien County and to the north by Van Buren County. The city of Dowagiac borders the township to the southeast.

The township is largely agricultural, though it has a large influx of summer visitors who own cottages or stay at summer resorts in the Sister Lakes area in the northwest part of the township.

Communities
Cushing was formed in 1874 and originally called Stark's Corners.  It had a post office from 1880 until 1904.
The unincorporated community of Sister Lakes, plus the lakes themselves, which are primarily located in adjacent Keeler Township in Van Buren County, extend into the township. The northern half of Silver Creek Township is served by the Sister Lakes Volunteer Fire Department, and the southern half is served by the Indian Lake Fire Department.

Demographics
As of the census of 2000, there were 3,491 people, 1,299 households, and 958 families residing in the township. The racial makeup of the township was 90.52% White, 0.83% African American, 1.17% Native American, 0.14% Asian, 5.67% from other races, and 1.66% from two or more races. Hispanic or Latino of any race were 10.08% of the population.

There were 1,299 households, out of which 27.5% had children under the age of 18 living with them, 63.8% were married couples living together, 7.3% had a female householder with no husband present, and 26.2% were non-families. 22.6% of all households were made up of individuals, and 10.1% had someone living alone who was 65 years of age or older.  The average household size was 2.56 and the average family size was 3.01.

In the township the population was spread out, with 25.4% under the age of 18, 7.8% from 18 to 24, 23.8% from 25 to 44, 28.0% from 45 to 64, and 15.1% who were 65 years of age or older.  The median age was 40 years. For every 100 females, there were 96.7 males.  For every 100 females age 18 and over, there were 98.2 males.

The median income for a household in the township was $42,572, and the median income for a family was $46,891. Males had a median income of $36,597 versus $20,428 for females. The per capita income for the township was $18,866.  About 6.0% of families and 10.1% of the population were below the poverty line, including 10.4% of those under age 18 and 8.8% of those age 65 or over.

References

Notes

Sources

External links
Silver Creek Township official website
Sister Lakes
Sister Lakes Fire Department

Townships in Cass County, Michigan
South Bend – Mishawaka metropolitan area
Townships in Michigan